The Journal of Asian and African Studies is a bimonthly peer-reviewed academic journal that covers research in the fields of Asian and African studies. The journal's editor-in-chief is Nigel C. Gibson (Emerson College). It was established in 1966 and is currently published by SAGE Publications.

Abstracting and indexing 
According to the Journal Citation Reports, the journal has a 2021 impact factor of 0.882. The Journal of Asian and African Studies is abstracted and indexed in:
 Scopus
 MLA - Modern Language Association Database
 Geobase
 ATLA Religion Database
 SCImago
 Worldwide Political Science Abstracts

External links

References

SAGE Publishing academic journals
English-language journals
Asian studies journals
Publications established in 1966
Bimonthly journals
African studies journals